Nuweiba Port is a seaport on the eastern portion of the Sinai Peninsula, roughly in the middle of the Gulf of Aqaba's coastline.

Location 
The port is located in the east of Nuweiba, a coastal town. It serves as terminal for Aqaba-bound RoRo ferries.

In 2021, the Egyptian government unveiled a plan to upgrade various Red Sea ports, and Nuweiba Port is one of them.

References 

Ports and harbours of Egypt
South Sinai Governorate